The RISEBA University of Applied Sciences is a private international business school located in Riga, Latvia. Until April 2016 it was known as the "Riga International School of Economics and Business Administration". The school was established in 1992. Other than Riga, the school has another campus in Daugavpils.

RISEBA comprises three major academic components or schools:
 School of Business with Bachelor, Master and PhD programmes, which cover the areas of business, management and economics  -  Faculty of Business and Economics
 School of Media and Communication with Bachelor and Master and  PhD programmes in arts and communications - Faculty of Media and Creative Technologies
 School of Architecture and Design, which currently offers a Bachelor programme in Architecture. - Faculty of Architecture and Design

Courses 
The school offers undergraduate and post-graduate and doctoral studies.

Notable alumni 

  (born on July 11, 1974) is a Latvian doctor, businessman and politician. Former Minister of Health of the Republic of Latvia. Currently, she represents the political party "Vienotība", has represented the "Latviijas zaļo un zemnieku" party, the list of which has been elected to the 13th Saeima.
  (born 1948) is a Latvian surgeon, professor and politician at the University of Latvia. Former deputy of the 6th Saeima and member of the Riga City Council for several terms.
 Andzej Gavriss is a multi award-winning director originally hailing from Latvia.

Gallery

References

External links 
 

Educational institutions established in 1992
Business schools in Latvia
Education in Riga
Universities and colleges in Latvia
Universities in Latvia
1992 establishments in Latvia